Tricholosporum atroviolaceum is a species of fungus in the family Tricholomataceae.

Taxonomy
The species was first described as Gymnopus atroviolaceus by American mycologist William Alphonso Murrill in 1938, based on a collection made in Gainesville, Florida. It was transferred to the genus Tricholosporum in 1982 by Tim Baroni.

References

External links

atroviolaceum
Fungi of North America
Fungi described in 1938
Taxa named by William Alphonso Murrill